The Cathedral of Saint Andrew also called Cathedral Church of Saint Andrew or simply Hagios Andreas is a Greek Orthodox basilica in the west side of the city center of Patras in Greece. Along with the nearby old church of St. Andrew, it constitutes a place of pilgrimage for Christians from all over the world. It is dedicated to the First-called Apostle of Christ, Saint Andrew.

History 
Construction of the Greek Byzantine-style church began in 1908 under the supervision of the architect Anastasios Metaxas, followed by Georgios Nomikos. It was inaugurated 66 years later, in 1974. According to University of Patras professor Charis Alk. Apostolopoulos who has extensively studied the church building, the church has a surface area of 1,900 m2 on the ground floor and additionally 700 m2 on the first level (used as a gynaeconitis). The church has a length of ~60 m, width  ~52 m and has a capacity of 7,000 people. Other sources give similar numbers for the size of the surface area (there are different numbers depending on the inclusion or not of the first level).

It is considered the largest Orthodox church in Greece and the third largest Byzantine-style church in the Balkans, after the Cathedral of Saint Sava in Belgrade and Alexander Nevsky Cathedral in Sofia. Other sources consider Church of Saint Panteleimon of Acharnai as the largest one in Greece. Over the central dome there is a 5-meter-long, gold-plated cross and over the other domes, there are 12 smaller crosses. These crosses symbolize Jesus and His apostles.
The interior of the church is decorated with Byzantine-style wall paintings and mosaics.

Relics

Relics of the apostle Saint Andrew are stored in the church. They consist of the small finger, part of the top of the cranium of the Apostle, and small portions of the cross on which he was martyred, all kept in a special shrine. The holy skull of the Apostle was sent there from St. Peter's Basilica, Rome in September 1964, on the orders of Pope Paul VI. Cardinal Bea led the party of 15 cardinals that presented the relic to Bishop Constantine of Patras on 24 September 1964. Thousands of people (among them prime minister Georgios Papandreou) and many Greek Orthodox bishops participated in the reception ceremony of the skull. After a procession through the streets of the city, the skull was placed in a special silver miter inside the church.
The cross of St. Andrew was taken from Greece during the Crusades by the Duke of Burgundy. Parts of the cross were kept since Middle Ages in the church of St. Victor in Marseilles. They were returned to Patras on 19 January 1980. The cross of the apostle was presented to the Bishop of Patras Nicodemus by the Roman Catholic delegation led by Cardinal Roger Etchegaray.

Gallery

The old Temple
The older, much smaller, cathedral of St Andrew is located beside the current one. It was designed by Lysandros Kaftanzoglou in the late 19th century.

See also
Saint Andrew
Apollon Theatre (Patras)
Archaeological Museum of Patras
Rio-Antirio bridge
List of large Orthodox cathedrals

References

Sources
Μ. Λεφαντζής, «Ο μεγάλος ναοδόμος Γεώργιος Νομικός», Περιοδικό Αρχιτέκτονες, Τεύχος 39, Μάιος-Ιούνιος 2003
Χ. Αποστολόπουλος, «Ιστορικά Στοιχεία από την Ανέγερση-Βλάβες στη Δομή του Νέου Ναού του Αγίου Ανδρέα Πατρών», 3ο Εθνικό Συνέδριο, Ήπιες Επεμβάσεις για την Προστασία των Ιστορικών Κατασκευών, Νέες Τάσεις Σχεδιασμού, 9-11 Απριλίου 2009 Θεσσαλονίκη, σελ. 441–450. 
Κώστας Τριαντάφυλλου. «0 νέος μεγάλος ναός στην Πάτρα του Πολιούχου της Αγίου Ανδρέα», Πελοποννησιακή Πρωτοχρονιά (1962) 306-3

External links

Official municipal website
The astonishing missionary journeys of the apostle Andrew
Holy Metropolis of Patras Website

Churches in Patras
Byzantine Revival architecture in Greece
Andrew the Apostle
Greek Orthodox cathedrals in Greece
Tourist attractions in Patras
Church buildings with domes
Tombs of apostles
Churches completed in 1974
20th-century churches in Greece